Alaca District is a district of the Çorum Province of Turkey. Its seat is the town of Alaca. Its area is 1,296 km2, and its population is 29,929 (2022).

Composition
There is one municipality in Alaca District:
 Alaca

There are 101 villages in Alaca District:

 Akçaköy
 Akçiçek
 Akören
 Akpınar
 Alacahüyük
 Altıntaş
 Bahçeli
 Balçıkhisar
 Belpınar
 Beşiktepe
 Boğaziçi
 Bolatçık
 Bozdoğan
 Büyükcamili
 Büyükdona
 Büyükhırka
 Büyükkeşlik
 Büyüksöğütözü
 Çalköy
 Çatak
 Çatalbaş
 Çatalkaya
 Çelebibağı
 Çetederesi
 Çevreli
 Çırçır
 Çikhasan
 Çöplü
 Çöplüavutmuş
 Çopraşık
 Dedepınar
 Değirmendere
 Değirmenönü
 Dereyazıcı
 Dutluca
 Eren
 Eskiyapar
 Evci
 Fakılar
 Gazipaşa
 Gerdekkaya
 Geven
 Gökören
 Gülderesi
 Güllük
 Harhar
 Haydarköy
 İbrahimköy
 İmat
 İsahacı
 İsmailli
 Kalecikkaya
 Kalınkaya
 Kapaklı
 Karaçal
 Karamahmut
 Karatepe
 Kargın
 Karnıkara
 Kayabüvet
 Kıcılı
 Kılavuz
 Killik
 Kızıllı
 Kızılyar
 Kızkaraca
 Koçhisar
 Körpınar
 Koyunoğlu
 Küçükcamili
 Küçükdona
 Küçükhırka
 Küçükkeşlik
 Külah
 Küre
 Kürkçü
 Kuyluş
 Kuyumcusaray
 Kuzkışla
 Mahmudiye
 Mazıbaşı
 Miyanesultan
 Onbaşılar
 Örükaya
 Perçem
 Sancı
 Sarısüleyman
 Seyitnizam
 Sincan
 Soğucak
 Sultanköy
 Suludere
 Tahirabat
 Tevfikiye
 Tutaş
 Ünalan
 Yatankavak
 Yenice
 Yeniköy
 Yeşilyurt
 Yüksekyayla

Population

References

Districts of Çorum Province